The 2019–20 Indiana Pacers season was the franchise's 53rd season and the 44th season in the NBA.

The season was suspended by the league officials following the games of March 11 after it was reported that Rudy Gobert tested positive for COVID-19. The season for the Pacers and 21 other playoff-contending teams resumed in the 2020 NBA Bubble on July 30, with Indiana finishing the season in the bubble with a 45–28 record and the fourth seed in the Eastern Conference.

The Pacers were defeated in four games by the eventual Eastern Conference champion Miami Heat in the first round of the playoffs. For the third time in four years the Pacers were swept in the playoffs, and the loss marked their fifth consecutive defeat in the first round. Head coach Nate McMillan was subsequently fired after four seasons, having failed to win a playoff series with a 3–16 postseason record.

NBA draft

Entering draft night, the Pacers held a first and a second-round draft pick. The 50th pick was traded to the Utah Jazz for cash considerations.

Roster

Standings

Division

Conference

Game log

Preseason

Regular season

|- style="background:#fcc;"
| 1
| October 23
| Detroit
| 
| Domantas Sabonis (27)
| Domantas Sabonis (13)
| Malcolm Brogdon (11)
| Bankers Life Fieldhouse17,923
| 0–1
|- style="background:#fcc;"
| 2
| October 26
| @ Cleveland
| 
| Malcolm Brogdon (30)
| Myles Turner (11)
| Malcolm Brogdon (10)
| Rocket Mortgage FieldHouse19,432
| 0–2
|- style="background:#fcc;"
| 3
| October 28
| @ Detroit
| 
| Domantas Sabonis (21)
| Domantas Sabonis (14)
| Malcolm Brogdon (11)
| Little Caesars Arena13,565
| 0–3
|- style="background:#cfc;"
| 4
| October 30
| @ Brooklyn
| 
| Domantas Sabonis (29)
| Domantas Sabonis (8)
| Malcolm Brogdon (13)
| Barclays Center17,083
| 1–3

|- style="background:#cfc;"
| 5
| November 1
| Cleveland
| 
| Malcolm Brogdon (25)
| Domantas Sabonis (17)
| Brogdon, McConnell (6)
| Bankers Life Fieldhouse16,079
| 2–3
|- style="background:#cfc;"
| 6
| November 3
| Chicago
| 
| T. J. Warren (26)
| T. J. Leaf (15)
| Malcolm Brogdon (7)
| Bankers Life Fieldhouse17,073
| 3–3
|- style="background:#fcc;"
| 7
| November 5
| @ Charlotte
| 
| T. J. Warren (33)
| Goga Bitadze (11)
| Malcolm Brogdon (8)
| Spectrum Center13,341
| 3–4
|- style="background:#cfc;"
| 8
| November 6
| Washington
| 
| T. J. Warren (21)
| Domantas Sabonis (17)
| Malcolm Brogdon (13)
| Bankers Life Fieldhouse16,171
| 4–4
|- style="background:#cfc;"
| 9
| November 8
| Detroit
| 
| Warren, Sabonis, McConnell (17)
| Domantas Sabonis (14)
| T. J. McConnell (9)
| Bankers Life Fieldhouse15,544
| 5–4
|- style="background:#cfc;"
| 10
| November 10
| @ Orlando
| 
| Domantas Sabonis (21)
| Domantas Sabonis (16)
| Brogdon, McConnell (8)
| Amway Center17,118
| 6–4
|- style="background:#cfc;"
| 11
| November 12
| Oklahoma City
| 
| T. J. Warren (23)
| Domantas Sabonis (16)
| Malcolm Brogdon (5)
| Bankers Life Fieldhouse15,838
| 7–4
|- style="background:#fcc;"
| 12
| November 15
| @ Houston
| 
| Sabonis, McDermott (18)
| Domantas Sabonis (13)
| T. J. McConnell (7)
| Toyota Center18,055
| 7–5
|- style="background:#fcc;"
| 13
| November 16
| Milwaukee
| 
| Myles Turner (16)
| Domantas Sabonis (14)
| Aaron Holiday (5)
| Bankers Life Fieldhouse17,024
| 7–6
|- style="background:#cfc;"
| 14
| November 18
| @ Brooklyn
| 
| Aaron Holiday (24)
| Domantas Sabonis (18)
| Aaron Holiday (13)
| Barclays Center14,140
| 8–6
|- style="background:#cfc;"
| 15
| November 23
| Orlando
| 
| Domantas Sabonis (25)
| Domantas Sabonis (9)
| T. J. McConnell (7)
| Bankers Life Fieldhouse16,446
| 9–6
|- style="background:#cfc;"
| 16
| November 25
| Memphis
| 
| T. J. Warren (26)
| Domantas Sabonis (13)
| Malcolm Brogdon (8)
| Bankers Life Fieldhouse15,141
| 10–6
|- style="background:#cfc;"
| 17
| November 27
| Utah
| 
| Sabonis, Warren (23)
| Domantas Sabonis (12)
| Malcolm Brogdon (8)
| Bankers Life Fieldhouse17,027
| 11–6
|- style="background:#cfc;"
| 18
| November 29
| Atlanta
| 
| Jeremy Lamb (20)
| Domantas Sabonis (12)
| Malcolm Brogdon (7)
| Bankers Life Fieldhouse15,827
| 12–6
|- style="background:#fcc;"
| 19
| November 30
| @ Philadelphia
| 
| T. J. Warren (29)
| Domantas Sabonis (10)
| Malcolm Brogdon (6)
| Wells Fargo Center20,517
| 12–7

|- style="background:#cfc;"
| 20
| December 2
| @ Memphis
| 
| Malcolm Brogdon (19)
| Domantas Sabonis (14)
| Malcolm Brogdon (9)
| FedExForum11,919
| 13–7
|- style="background:#cfc;"
| 21
| December 4
| @ Oklahoma City
| 
| T. J. Warren (24)
| Domantas Sabonis (13)
| T. J. McConnell (8)
| Chesapeake Energy Arena18,203
| 14–7
|- style="background:#fcc;"
| 22
| December 6
| @ Detroit
| 
| T. J. Warren (26)
| Domantas Sabonis (13)
| Brogdon, Sabonis (5)
| Little Caesars Arena14,894
| 14–8
|- style="background:#cfc;"
| 23
| December 7
| @ New York
| 
| T. J. Warren (25)
| Domantas Sabonis (15)
| T. J. McConnell (11)
| Madison Square Garden19,110
| 15–8
|- style="background:#fcc;"
| 24
| December 9
| L. A. Clippers
| 
| Malcolm Brogdon (20)
| Domantas Sabonis (22)
| Domantas Sabonis (4)
| Bankers Life Fieldhouse14,644
| 15–9
|- style="background:#cfc;"
| 25
| December 11
| Boston
| 
| Malcolm Brogdon (29)
| Domantas Sabonis (14)
| Brogdon, Sabonis (8)
| Bankers Life Fieldhouse15,637
| 16–9
|- style="background:#cfc;"
| 26
| December 13
| @ Atlanta
| 
| Malcolm Brogdon (19)
| Domantas Sabonis (14)
| Malcolm Brogdon (12)
| State Farm Arena15,121
| 17–9
|- style="background:#cfc;"
| 27
| December 15
| Charlotte
| 
| Aaron Holiday (23)
| Domantas Sabonis (12)
| T. J. McConnell (8)
| Bankers Life Fieldhouse16,061
| 18–9
|- style="background:#cfc;"
| 28
| December 17
| L. A. Lakers
| 
| Domantas Sabonis (26)
| Domantas Sabonis (10)
| Malcolm Brogdon (6)
| Bankers Life Fieldhouse17,923
| 19–9
|- style="background:#cfc;"
| 29
| December 20
| Sacramento
| 
| T. J. Warren (23)
| Domantas Sabonis (9)
| T. J. McConnell (8)
| Bankers Life Fieldhouse14,649
| 20–9
|- style="background:#fcc;"
| 30
| December 22
| @ Milwaukee
| 
| Domantas Sabonis (19)
| Domantas Sabonis (18)
| Malcolm Brogdon (10)
| Fiserv Forum18,029
| 20–10
|- style="background:#cfc;"
| 31
| December 23
| Toronto
| 
| Turner, Warren (24)
| Domantas Sabonis (17)
| Aaron Holiday (13)
| Bankers Life Fieldhouse17,164
| 21–10
|- style="background:#fcc;"
| 32
| December 27
| @ Miami
| 
| Aaron Holiday (17)
| Domantas Sabonis (7)
| Aaron Holiday (9)
| American Airlines Arena19,767
| 21–11
|- style="background:#fcc;"
| 33
| December 28
| @ New Orleans
| 
| Aaron Holiday (25)
| Domantas Sabonis (16)
| T. J. McConnell (6)
| Smoothie King Center15,391
| 21–12
|- style="background:#cfc;"
| 34
| December 31
| Philadelphia
| 
| Domantas Sabonis (23)
| Domantas Sabonis (10)
| T. J. McConnell (10)
| Bankers Life Fieldhouse17,923
| 22–12

|- style="background:#fcc;"
| 35
| January 2
| Denver
| 
| Jeremy Lamb (30)
| Domantas Sabonis (9)
| Aaron Holiday (10)
| Bankers Life Fieldhouse16,688
| 22–13
|- style="background:#fcc;"
| 36
| January 4
| @ Atlanta
| 
| Domantas Sabonis (25)
| Domantas Sabonis (11)
| Aaron Holiday (6)
| State Farm Arena16,420
| 22–14
|- style="background:#cfc;"
| 37
| January 6
| @ Charlotte
| 
| T. J. Warren (36)
| Domantas Sabonis (12)
| Sabonis, McConnell (7)
| Spectrum Center13,009
| 23–14
|- style="background:#fcc;"
| 38
| January 8
| Miami
| 
| Domantas Sabonis (27)
| Domantas Sabonis (14)
| Domantas Sabonis (6)
| Bankers Life Fieldhouse17,040
| 23–15
|- style="background:#cfc;"
| 39
| January 10
| @ Chicago
| 
| Myles Turner (27)
| Myles Turner (14)
| Aaron Holiday (8)
| United Center20,229
| 24–15
|- style="background:#cfc;"
| 40
| January 13
| Philadelphia
| 
| Warren, Brogdon (21)
| Domantas Sabonis (16)
| Malcolm Brogdon (9)
| Bankers Life Fieldhouse15,257
| 25–15
|- style="background:#cfc;"
| 41
| January 15
| @ Minnesota
| 
| Domantas Sabonis (29)
| Domantas Sabonis (13)
| T. J. McConnell (8)
| Target Center12,648
| 26–15
|- style="background:#cfc;"
| 42
| January 17
| Minnesota
| 
| T. J. Warren (28)
| Doug McDermott (8)
| Malcolm Brogdon (10)
| Bankers Life Fieldhouse16,248
| 27–15
|- style="background:#cfc;"
| 43
| January 19
| @ Denver
| 
| Doug McDermott (24)
| Domantas Sabonis (15)
| Domantas Sabonis (10)
| Pepsi Center19,520
| 28–15
|- style="background:#fcc;"
| 44
| January 20
| @ Utah
| 
| Turner, Holiday (12)
| Domantas Sabonis (8)
| T. J. McConnell (10)
| Vivint Smart Home Arena18,306
| 28–16
|- style="background:#cfc;"
| 45
| January 22
| @ Phoenix
| 
| T. J. Warren (25)
| Domantas Sabonis (13)
| T. J. McConnell (11)
| Talking Stick Resort Arena14,691
| 29–16
|- style="background:#cfc;"
| 46
| January 24
| @ Golden State
| 
| T. J. Warren (33)
| Domantas Sabonis (10)
| McConnell, Sabonis (8)
| Chase Center18,064
| 30–16
|- style="background:#fcc;"
| 47
| January 26
| @ Portland
| 
| Jeremy Lamb (28)
| Domantas Sabonis (14)
| Domantas Sabonis (11)
| Moda Center19,663
| 30–17
|- style="background:#cfc;"
| 48
| January 29
| Chicago
| 
| T. J. Warren (25)
| Domantas Sabonis (11)
| Malcolm Brogdon (9)
| Bankers Life Fieldhouse17,923
| 31–17

|- style="background:#fcc;"
| 49
| February 1
| New York
| 
| Domantas Sabonis (25)
| Domantas Sabonis (8)
| Malcolm Brogdon (12)
| Bankers Life Fieldhouse17,923
| 31–18
|- style="background:#fcc;"
| 50
| February 3
| Dallas
| 
| Domantas Sabonis (26)
| Domantas Sabonis (12)
| Domantas Sabonis (9)
| Bankers Life Fieldhouse15,086
| 31–19
|- style="background:#fcc;"
| 51
| February 5
| @ Toronto
| 
| Malcolm Brogdon (24)
| Domantas Sabonis (11)
| Domantas Sabonis (10)
| Scotiabank Arena19,800
| 31–20
|- style="background:#fcc;"
| 52
| February 7
| Toronto
| 
| Domantas Sabonis (19)
| Domantas Sabonis (16)
| Malcolm Brogdon (8)
| Bankers Life Fieldhouse17,028
| 31–21
|- style="background:#fcc;"
| 53
| February 8
| New Orleans
| 
| Jeremy Lamb (26)
| Brogdon, Sabonis, Turner (8)
| Brogdon, Sabonis (6)
| Bankers Life Fieldhouse17,923
| 31–22
|- style="background:#fcc;"
| 54
| February 10
| Brooklyn
| 
| Domantas Sabonis (23)
| Domantas Sabonis (10)
| Domantas Sabonis (11)
| Bankers Life Fieldhouse16,761
| 31–23
|- style="background:#cfc;"
| 55
| February 12
| Milwaukee
| 
| T. J. Warren (35)
| Myles Turner (10)
| Malcolm Brogdon (13)
| Bankers Life Fieldhouse17,018
| 32–23
|- style="background:#cfc;"
| 56
| February 21
| @ New York
| 
| T. J. Warren (27)
| Domantas Sabonis (13)
| Malcolm Brogdon (6)
| Madison Square Garden19,812
| 33–23
|- style="background:#fcc;"
| 57
| February 23
| @ Toronto
| 
| Holiday, Sabonis (14)
| Domantas Sabonis (11)
| Aaron Holiday (6)
| Scotiabank Arena19,800
| 33–24
|- style="background:#cfc;"
| 58
| February 25
| Charlotte
| 
| Domantas Sabonis (21)
| Domantas Sabonis (15)
| Domantas Sabonis (9)
| Bankers Life Fieldhouse16,088
| 34–24
|- style="background:#cfc;"
| 59
| February 27
| Portland
| 
| Domantas Sabonis (20)
| Domantas Sabonis (11)
| Malcolm Brogdon (8)
| Bankers Life Fieldhouse16,872
| 35–24
|- style="background:#cfc;"
| 60
| February 29
| @ Cleveland
| 
| T. J. Warren (30)
| Domantas Sabonis (13)
| Domantas Sabonis (9)
| Rocket Mortgage FieldHouse19,432
| 36–24

|- style="background:#cfc;"
| 61
| March 2
| @ San Antonio
| 
| Malcolm Brogdon (26)
| Domantas Sabonis (11)
| Malcolm Brogdon (7)
| AT&T Center17,635
| 37–24
|- style="background:#fcc;"
| 62
| March 4
| @ Milwaukee
| 
| T. J. Warren (18)
| Domantas Sabonis (10)
| Domantas Sabonis (7)
| Fiserv Forum17,695
| 37–25
|- style="background:#cfc;"
| 63
| March 6
| @ Chicago
| 
| Domantas Sabonis (24)
| Domantas Sabonis (12)
| Edmond Sumner (5)
| United Center20,229
| 38–25
|- style="background:#cfc;"
| 64
| March 8
| @ Dallas
| 
| Domantas Sabonis (20)
| Domantas Sabonis (17)
| Victor Oladipo (7)
| American Airlines Center20,324
| 39–25
|- style="background:#fcc;"
| 65
| March 10
| Boston
| 
| Domantas Sabonis (28)
| Domantas Sabonis (9)
| Domantas Sabonis (8)
| Bankers Life Fieldhouse17,053
| 39–26

|- style="background:#cfc;"
| 66
| August 1
| Philadelphia
| 
| T. J. Warren (53)
| Victor Oladipo (7)
| Aaron Holiday (10)
| Visa Athletic CenterNo In-Person Attendance
| 40–26
|- style="background:#cfc;"
| 67
| August 3
| @ Washington
| 
| T. J. Warren (34)
| T. J. Warren (11)
| Malcolm Brogdon (6)
| Visa Athletic CenterNo In-Person Attendance
| 41–26
|- style="background:#cfc;"
| 68
| August 4
| Orlando
| 
| T. J. Warren (32)
| Myles Turner (6)
| Malcolm Brogdon (8)
| Visa Athletic CenterNo In-Person Attendance
| 42–26
|- style="background:#fcc;"
| 69
| August 6
| @ Phoenix
| 
| Malcolm Brogdon (25)
| T. J. Warren (11)
| Malcolm Brogdon (6)
| Visa Athletic CenterNo In-Person Attendance
| 42–27
|- style="background:#cfc;"
| 70
| August 8
| L. A. Lakers
| 
| T. J. Warren (39)
| Oladipo, Sampson (7)
| Aaron Holiday (7)
| HP Field HouseNo In-Person Attendance
| 43–27
|- style="background:#fcc;"
| 71
| August 10
| @ Miami
| 
| Victor Oladipo (14)
| Malcolm Brogdon (8)
| Malcolm Brogdon (6)
| Visa Athletic CenterNo In-Person Attendance
| 43–28
|- style="background:#cfc;"
| 72
| August 12
| @ Houston
| 
| Holiday, Turner (18)
| Myles Turner (12)
| T. J. McConnell (7)
| The ArenaNo In-Person Attendance
| 44–28
|- style="background:#cfc;"
| 73
| August 14
| Miami
| 
| Doug McDermott (23)
| Alize Johnson (17)
| T. J. Warren (8)
| The ArenaNo In-Person Attendance
| 45–28

|- style="background:#;"
| 66
| March 14
| @ Philadelphia
| 
|
|
|
| Wells Fargo Center
|
|- style="background:#;"
| 67
| March 18
| Golden State
| 
|
|
|
| Bankers Life Fieldhouse
|
|- style="background:#;"
| 68
| March 20
| Miami
| 
|
|
|
| Bankers Life Fieldhouse
|
|- style="background:#;"
| 69
| March 21
| Cleveland
| 
|
|
|
| Bankers Life Fieldhouse
|
|- style="background:#;"
| 70
| March 23
| Phoenix
| 
|
|
|
| Bankers Life Fieldhouse
|
|- style="background:#;"
| 71
| March 25
| @ Orlando
| 
|
|
|
| Amway Center
|
|- style="background:#;"
| 72
| March 27
| Houston
| 
|
|
|
| Bankers Life Fieldhouse
|
|- style="background:#;"
| 73
| March 29
| @ Sacramento
| 
|
|
|
| Golden 1 Center
|
|- style="background:#;"
| 74
| March 30
| @ LA Clippers
| 
|
|
|
| Staples Center
|
|- style="background:#;"
| 75
| April 1
| @ LA Lakers
| 
|
|
|
| Staples Center
|
|- style="background:#;"
| 76
| April 3
| Brooklyn
| 
|
|
|
| Bankers Life Fieldhouse
|
|- style="background:#;"
| 77
| April 5
| Washington
| 
|
|
|
| Bankers Life Fieldhouse
|
|- style="background:#;"
| 78
| April 7
| @ Miami
| 
|
|
|
| American Airlines Arena
|
|- style="background:#;"
| 79
| April 8
| @ Boston
| 
|
|
|
| TD Garden
|
|- style="background:#;"
| 80
| April 11
| Orlando
| 
|
|
|
| Bankers Life Fieldhouse
|
|- style="background:#;"
| 81
| April 13
| San Antonio
| 
|
|
|
| Bankers Life Fieldhouse
|
|- style="background:#;"
| 82
| April 15
| @ Washington
| 
|
|
|
| Capital One Arena
|

Playoffs 

|- style="background:#fcc;"
| 1
| August 18
| Miami
| 
| Warren, Brogdon (22)
| Myles Turner (9)
| Malcolm Brogdon (10)
| AdventHealth ArenaNo in-person attendance
| 0–1
|- style="background:#fcc;"
| 2
| August 20
| Miami
| 
| Victor Oladipo (22)
| Myles Turner (8)
| Malcolm Brogdon (9)
| The Field HouseNo in-person attendance
| 0–2
|- style="background:#fcc;"
| 3
| August 22
| @ Miami
| 
| Malcolm Brogdon (34)
| Myles Turner (12)
| Malcolm Brogdon (14)
| AdventHealth ArenaNo in-person attendance
| 0–3
|- style="background:#fcc;"
| 4
| August 24
| @ Miami
| 
| Victor Oladipo (25)
| Myles Turner (14)
| Malcolm Brogdon (7)
| The Field HouseNo in-person attendance
| 0–4

Player Statistics

Regular season

Playoffs

Player Statistics Citation:

Transactions

Trades

Free agents

Re-signed

Additions

Subtractions

References

Indiana Pacers seasons
Indiana Pacers
Indiana Pacers
Indiana Pacers